Weird West is an action role-playing video game developed by WolfEye Studios and published by Devolver Digital. The game was released for Windows, PlayStation 4 and Xbox One on March 31, 2022.

Gameplay
Weird West is a top-down action role-playing game with elements of the immersive sim genre, with randomized elements through each playthrough. The game is based on the Weird West genre it borrows its title from, in which the player takes the role of heroes in the American frontier who encounter supernatural elements. The game features the stories of five bounty hunters. The world is designed to be interactive and responsive to the player's action. For instance, when the player shoots at an ammo box, it will explode. Actions done by the player in the game are permanent, meaning that they cannot be undone through respawning. The game also features a permadeath mode in which the player character and their companions will die permanently. Actual gameplay is similar to that of a twin-stick shooter, with the team describing it as "action-y version of Fallout 1 or 2".

 Development 
Raphaël Colantonio and Julien Roby, Arkane Studios' former Executive Producer, announced in November 2019 they had earlier formed a new studio, WolfEye Studios, a twenty-person studio working distributively. They announced their first game, Weird West, at The Game Awards 2019, to be published by Devolver Digital. While the game features supernatural elements, it was not designed to be a horror game. Unlike most immersive sims, the game was not played from a first-person perspective, and instead adopted a top-down perspective that was inspired by the early Ultima and Fallout games. Chris Avellone was originally involved as a coach to the game's writing team. Since the game includes the presence of Native Americans, the team invited the Anishinaabe to ensure that their depiction in the game is authentic, and added Elizabeth LaPensée, who is Anishinaabe and Métis, to the game's writing team. Weird Wolves, a musical band established by Colantonio and Ava Gore, composed some of the game's soundtracks.  The game was released on March 31, 2022 for Windows, PlayStation 4, and Xbox One.

 Reception Weird West received "generally positive" reviews for PC and Xbox One and "mixed or average" reviews for PlayStation 4, according to review aggregator Metacritic.Destructoid liked the game's compelling story, world, exploration, frantic combat, and player choice, but lamented the presence of technical issues. Game Informer gave the game an 8.5 out of 10, writing, "Weird Wests best assets are its well-developed characters and deep gameplay systems, but its overall production value is underwhelming." GameSpot reviewed the title less positively, commending its writing, character dynamics, and old-school pulp fiction aesthetic, while taking issue with its inelegant combat, binary morality system, camerawork, unbalanced upgrade system, and stingy progression. GamesRadar+ similarly praised the setting and the player's freedom to create their own story while citing the finicky morality system as problematic. IGN praised the game's bizarre encounters, twists, reveals, and chaotic stealth and combat, while criticizing the dull loot and technical issues. PC Gamer'' praised the game's ability to react to the player's choices, but criticized its combat, writing, "When fighting does break out, it’s refreshingly and mercifully quick. However, between that dingy visual style, and an overly complex twin-stick control scheme, I never found it all that enjoyable."

References

External links 
 

2022 video games
Action role-playing video games
Devolver Digital games
Immersive sims
Indie video games
PlayStation 4 games
Single-player video games
Unreal Engine games
Video games developed in Canada
Western (genre) video games
Windows games
Xbox One games